The 2012 season was Haugesund's third season in the Tippeligaen following their promotion in 2009 and their 4th season with Jostein Grindhaug as manager.

Squad 
As of 23 August 2012

Out on loan

Transfers

Winter

In:

Out:

Summer

In:

Out:

Competitions

Tippeligaen

Results summary

Results by round

Results

Table

Norwegian Cup

Squad statistics

Appearances and goals

|-
|colspan="14"|Players away from Haugesund on loan:

|-
|colspan="14"|Players who appeared for Haugesund no longer at the club:

|}

Goal scorers

Disciplinary record

References

FK Haugesund seasons
Haugesund